The Return of the Condor Heroes is a Hong Kong wuxia television series adapted from Louis Cha's novel of the same title, produced by TVB. It was first broadcast on TVB Jade from 31 October 1983 to 6 January 1984 in Hong Kong. A total of 50 episodes were produced. The serial was re-aired in 1988, 1990, 1997, 2013, and 2018 on TVB Jade.

The series averaged a rating of 62 points. It became the second most watched series in Hong Kong history.
Louis Cha stated that this adaptation satisfied him the most.

Cast

 Note: Some of the characters' names are in Cantonese romanisation.

 Andy Lau as Yeung Guo
 Idy Chan as Little Dragon Maiden
 Bryan Leung as Kwok Ching
 Susanna Au-yeung as Wong Yung
 Annie Liu On Lai as Kwok Fu
 Isabella Wong as Kwok Sheung
 Kenneth Tsang as Wong Yeuk-sze
 Chun Wong as Chow Pak-tung
 Lau Dan as Hung Tsat-kung
 Yeung Chak-lam as Au-yeung Fung
 Lau Siu-ming as Yat-dang
 Lisa Lui as Lee Mok-sau
 Cheung Lui as Golden Wheels Imperial Adviser
 Ha Yu as Yau Chu-kei
 Wong Oi-ming as Ching Ying
 Chan Fok-sang as Luk Mo-sheung
 Kwong Chor-fai as Yan Chi-bing
 Kam Kwok-wai as Chiu Chi-king
 Felix Lok as Lee Chi-sheung
 Simon Yam as Ye-lut Chai
 Amy Wu as Ye-lut Yin
 Kent Tong as Fok-do
 Alex Man as Luk Lap-ding
 Benz Hui as Kung-suen Chi
 Law Lan as Kau Chin-chak
 Yu Mo-lin as Granny Sun
 Rainbow Ching as Suen But-yee
 Leung Siu-tik as Wong Chu-yat
 Chan On-ying as Sor-ku
 Regina Tsang as Ying-ku
 Richard Ng as Luk Koon-ying
 Susanna Kwan as Lam Chiu-ying
 Lau Kwok-sing as Tat-yee-ba
 Chu Siu-bo as Kung-suen Luk-ngok
 Kam Kwok-wai as Chiu Chi-king
 Shih Kien as Kau Chin-yan (Chi-yan)
 Lee Lung-kei as Wong Chung-yeung
 Wong Man-yee as Yuen-ngan Ping
 Chan Yuk-lam as Hung Ling-bor
 Ma Chung-tak as Mo Sam-tung
 Mak Tsi-wan as Mo Sau-man
 Lee Shu-ka as Mo Dun-yu
 Kong Ngai as Or Chun-ngok
 Law Wai-ping as Chu Tze-lau
 Kiu Hung as Dim-chong Yu-yan
 Chan Yau-hau as Ye-lut Chor-choi
 Chan Tik-hak as Lo Yau-keuk
 Cho Kai as Elder Pang
 Ho Pik-kin as Indian Monk
 Tam Bing-man as Wan Hak-sai
 Lam Wai-kin as Siu-seung-tsi
 Chan Kwok-kuen as Ma Kwong-jor
 Wong Chi-wai as Nei-mor-sing
 Philip Chan as Luk Chin-yuen
 Kau Hung-ping as Ho Yuen-kwan
 Poon Wang-pan as Kwok Por-lo
 Yip Tin-hang as Kublai Khan
 Wai Lik as Möngke Khan
 Ma Hing-sang as Lui Man-wun
 Eddy Ko as Fung Mak-fung

Episodes

References

External links
 

TVB dramas
1983 Hong Kong television series debuts
1984 Hong Kong television series endings
Hong Kong wuxia television series
Martial arts television series
Television shows based on The Return of the Condor Heroes
Television series set in the Southern Song
Hong Kong action television series
Hong Kong romance television series
Television series set in the Mongol Empire
Sequel television series
Television series about orphans
1980s Hong Kong television series
Cantonese-language television shows
Television shows written by Wai Ka-fai
1980s romance television series